Gropman is surname. Notable people with the surname include:

Alan L. Gropman (born 1938), American military officer, college professor, and author
Andrea Gropman, American pediatric neurologist
Eliana Gropman (born 2001), American ice dancer

See also
Grohman (disambiguation)
Groopman